Jamie Alan Staff MBE (born 30 April 1973) is an English racing cyclist and coach, formerly on BMX and later on the track. A World and Olympic champion, he has also won numerous other medals at World Championships, World Cups and at the Commonwealth Games.

Profile
Born in Ashford, Kent, Staff started in BMX when he was 9 years old, after seeing friends riding. A BMX rider who has won just about everything from the World Championships downwards, he decided at the end of 2001 that he wanted to win an Olympic medal. As BMX was not an Olympic sport at the time, he turned his attention to track cycling.

He qualified for the GB Cycling Team at the first attempt. A natural competitor, he revels in the combative nature of the Sprint and the keirin, though his stand-out rides so far have been in the team sprint and the Kilo.

At the 2002 Commonwealth Games, he was a member of the silver medal-winning England team sprint trio, an impressive semi-finalist in the sprint (during which he broke the national 200 m record) and the winner of a bronze in the Kilometer, behind GB team-mates Chris Hoy and Jason Queally.

However, he surpassed all expectations when he helped GB to win a gold medal in the team sprint at the 2002 UCI Track World Championships in Copenhagen, less than a year after taking up track racing. In 2003 he continued to progress, recording two personal best times in the "Kilo" (1 km time trial) and a win in the Mexico World Cup in the discipline.

In 2004 he competed at the Athens Olympics in the keirin and team sprint, but not medalling in either. This was despite becoming Keirin world champion only months before and setting the second fastest time in the Team Sprint competition, only to be knocked out by the German team, who set the fastest time.

He continued to focus on the sprint, achieving multiple silvers and bronzes at World Championships, and the 2006 Commonwealth Games. He finally tasted success again in the World Record-breaking British team sprint trio at the 2008 Beijing Olympics. Staff was responsible for the fastest ever first lap in a team sprint.

He was appointed Member of the Order of the British Empire (MBE) in the 2009 New Year Honours.

He announced his retirement from racing on 28 March 2010. In June it was announced that he would be joining USA Cycling to manage the USA national track sprint program.

Staff plans to set up a Youth Cycling Academy in Kent, UK in the near future which he will travel to and from the US and regularly oversee, the aim being to encourage new British talent.

BMX
Staff was one of the many imports competing in the United States national ABA (American Bicycle Association) and NBL (National Bicycle League) series, and regularly made AA Pro mains (winning NBL Pro Nat.#1 (Elite) Men (AA) in 2001), (winning the World BMX title in 1996) until 2001 when he decided to concentrate on track cycling. Staff still participates in BMX occasionally (as in the 2002, X Games VIII - BMX Downhill).

Major results
1996 World BMX Champion
2002 Bronze Kilo (England), Commonwealth Games
2002 Silver Team Sprint (England), Commonwealth Games
2002 Gold Team Sprint, World Championships
2003 Silver Sprint, National Championships
2003 Silver Sprint, World Cup, Mexico
2003 Gold Kilometre, World Cup, Mexico
2003 Gold Team Sprint, World Cup, South Africa
2004 Gold Keirin, UCI Track World Championships, Melbourne
2005 Gold Team Sprint, World Championships
2004 Bronze Team Sprint, World Championships, Melbourne
2006 Silver Team Sprint, Commonwealth Games, Melbourne
2006 Silver Team Sprint UCI Track World Championship Team Sprint
2007 Bronze UCI Track World Championship Kilometre
2008 Silver UCI Track World Championships Team Sprint
2008 Gold Team Sprint, Olympic Games, Beijing
2009 Silver UCI Track World Championships Team Sprint

See also
Cycling at the 2004 Summer Olympics – Men's keirin
Cycling at the 2004 Summer Olympics – Men's team sprint
Great Britain at the 2004 Summer Olympics

References

BMX riders
English male cyclists
English Olympic medallists
People from Ashford, Kent
1973 births
Living people
Olympic cyclists of Great Britain
Olympic gold medallists for Great Britain
Cyclists at the 2004 Summer Olympics
Cyclists at the 2008 Summer Olympics
Members of the Order of the British Empire
Olympic medalists in cycling
UCI BMX World Champions (elite men)
Medalists at the 2008 Summer Olympics
English cycling coaches
UCI Track Cycling World Champions (men)
Commonwealth Games bronze medallists for England
Commonwealth Games silver medallists for England
Cyclists at the 2002 Commonwealth Games
Cyclists at the 2006 Commonwealth Games
Commonwealth Games medallists in cycling
English track cyclists
Medallists at the 2002 Commonwealth Games
Medallists at the 2006 Commonwealth Games